Doineann ("stormy weather") is a 2021 Northern Irish drama film in the Irish language, directed by Damian McCann.

Plot
Tomás is a Dublin investigative journalist, reporting on criminal gangs. He goes on holiday to an island off Ireland's coast with his family. He receives an urgent call to return to Dublin, but when he later returns to the island his wife and child are missing. A local Garda detective starts to help him find them, as the storm closes in.

Production
Doineann was filmed in County Down and Islandmagee in winter 2020–21 and received support from Northern Ireland Screen, BBC Gaeilge and TG4; it is the first Irish language feature to be made and produced in Northern Ireland.

It was filmed on an Arri Alexa Mini with Panavision Primo Lenses in a 2.39:1 aspect ratio.

Release
Doineann premiered on 25 July 2021 at the Galway Film Fleadh. The Irish Times, Irish Examiner and entertainment.ie all scored it three stars out of five. Reviewers noted the similarities to Nordic noir and praised the performance of Bríd Brennan as a Columbo-style investigator, but criticised the latter part of the film as clichéd.

Peter Coonan received a nomination at the 18th Irish Film & Television Awards (IFTAs), for best supporting actor in a film.

References

External links

 

2021 drama films
2020s mystery drama films
Irish mystery drama films
Irish detective films
Irish-language films
English-language Irish films
Police detective films
Films set on islands
Films set in Ireland
Films shot in Northern Ireland